Antonio Allochio (20 September 1888 – 18 July 1956) was an Italian fencer. He won a gold medal in the team épée event at the 1920 Summer Olympics.

References

External links
 
 

1888 births
1956 deaths
Italian male fencers
Olympic fencers of Italy
Fencers at the 1920 Summer Olympics
Olympic gold medalists for Italy
Olympic medalists in fencing
Sportspeople from the Province of Brescia
Medalists at the 1920 Summer Olympics